Edward (Ward) Van Dijck (22 March 1918 – 22 April 1977) was a Belgian professional road bicycle racer during the 1940s and 1950s.

Van Dijck became the second Belgian to win the Spanish Grand Tour at the 1947 Vuelta a España—which covered 24 stages and 3,893 km—upsetting Manuel Costa of Spain and 1945 Vuelta champion Delio Rodríguez of Spain.

Major results 

1942
Antwerpen – Gent – Antwerpen
1943
Grand Prix de Wallonie
Roosbeek
1944
Bertem
Verviers
1945
Bertem
1946
Brussel/Berchem – Ingooigem
Ronde van Limburg
1947
Vuelta a España:
 Winner overall classification
Winner stages 16B and 21A
1948
Tour de France
 Winner stage 16
1949
Rijkevorsel
1950
GP Stad Vilvoorde
1951
Leuven

External links 

Official Tour de France results for Edward Van Dijck

1918 births
1977 deaths
Belgian male cyclists
Belgian Tour de France stage winners
Vuelta a España winners
Belgian Vuelta a España stage winners
People from Herent
Cyclists from Flemish Brabant